Machete Kills (also known as Robert Rodriguez's Machete Kills) is a 2013 American action exploitation film directed by Robert Rodriguez, with a screenplay by Kyle Ward, from a story by Robert and Marcel Rodriguez. Based on the eponymous character from the Spy Kids franchise, it is a sequel to Machete (2010), and is the third film based on a fake trailer in Grindhouse (2007). Danny Trejo, Michelle Rodriguez, Tom Savini, Electra and Elise Avellan, Felix Sabates, and Jessica Alba reprise their roles from the first film, and are joined by series newcomers Mel Gibson, Demián Bichir, Amber Heard, Sofía Vergara, Lady Gaga, Antonio Banderas, Cuba Gooding Jr., Vanessa Hudgens, Alexa Vega, William Sadler, Marko Zaror, and Charlie Sheen (credited by his birth name of "Carlos Estévez"). The film follows the titular ex-federal (Trejo) as he is recruited by the U.S. President (Sheen) to stop an arms dealer (Gibson) and a revolutionary (Bichir).

Machete Kills was released in the United States by Open Road Films on October 11, 2013, failing to recoup its budget of $20 million and received mostly negative reviews, with critics citing the overuse of plot points, poorly produced CGI, and the "out-of-place" science fiction elements.

Plot
Machete Cortez and agent Sartana Rivera attempt to arrest corrupt military members involved in a weapons deal with a Mexican drug cartel group. The gangsters wipe out the military team, but they in turn are wiped by another party of masked men headed by a luchador-masked leader who kills Sartana. Machete is arrested and hanged by corrupt Sheriff Doakes and Deputy Clebourne. However, he survives the hanging and the officers receive a call from the US President Rathcock. At the White House, Rathcock offers to wipe Machete's criminal record and grant him citizenship if he can confirm a threat from Marcos Mendez, a psychopath who wants to fire a nuclear missile at Washington, D.C. if the American government does not stop the cartels and the corrupt Mexican government.

Machete travels to San Antonio, where he meets handler and beauty contestant Blanca Vasquez. At Acapulco he looks for Cereza, who can lead him to Mendez, but is attacked by brothel madam Desdemona, who is Cereza's mother. As Mendez's beloved virgin, Cereza warns Machete's about Mendez's split personality. As they travel to Mendez's headquarters, Mendez's enforcer Zaror receives a call from Mendez, and shoots Cereza.

Machete learns that Mendez has wired the missile's launch device to his own heart so that if he dies, the missile fires. Mendez kills the device's designer and activates its 24-hour timer. Killing Zaror along the way, Machete intends to escort Mendez to the US and find a way to disarm the missile. Mendez shares that he is a self-proclaimed secret agent who tried to expose his corrupt superiors, only to be betrayed and forced to watch his wife and family being tortured and killed, causing him to develop the split personality.

As they head to the border, a hit is put on Machete, and the two are targeted by multiple assailants including: Desdemona and her prostitute assassins; a shapeshifting hitman called El/La Camaleón; Doakes and Clebourne; and various locals. Machete and Mendez evade the assailants, only to be caught by a reborn Zaror and the masked  mercenaries who killed Sartana. Zaror decapitates Mendez, and Machete is riddled with bullets.

Machete wakes up to find himself in a healing tank. He meets businessman and weapons inventor Luther Voz, who has kept Mendez's beating heart preserved in a jar. Voz shares his plan to manipulate extremists throughout the world to fire nuclear weapons at each other, to escape to an orbiting space station to rebuild society in space, and to have Machete succeed Zaror as a prototype for his army of cloned enforcers. Machete escapes the facility, meeting up with his old comrade Luz, who then refers him to Osiris, a former enemy who has since joined Luz's network and could possibly disarm the device.

Machete contacts Vasquez to update her on progress, but is betrayed and ambushed at their meeting since Vasquez has sided with Voz. Machete follows her to the desert by jumping on her vehicle's rooftop, but is thrown off. Machete gets a ride from El Camaleón, who tries to kill him one last time, but he escapes, leaving El Camaleón to be killed by a racist group of rednecks on border patrol. Machete and Luz's Network infiltrate a fundraiser at Voz's base of operations, but Voz shoots the jar and kills Osiris. Machete realizes Voz was the masked man who killed Sartana and fights him. He severely burns Voz's face, forcing him to retreat and don a metallic silver mask. Meanwhile, Vasquez shoots Luz in her good eye, completely blinding her. Luz fights and kills Vasquez, but she in turn is frozen in carbonite and captured by Voz.

While Voz and his group depart to space, Machete jumps on Mendez's missile as it launches, disarming it in mid-air, and sending it into the Rio Grande. Rathcock's forces retrieve Machete; he tells him that the other missiles have been disarmed. Learning that Voz is in space, Rathcock then asks Machete to follow them there on a SpaceX rocket.

Framing the beginning and end of the film are trailers that promote Machete Kills Again...In Space.

Cast
  

Jessica Alba reprises her role as Sartana Rivera in an uncredited cameo appearance. Tom Savini reprises his role as Osiris Amanpour, an assassin who has since become a priest, joining Luz's Network. Robert Rodriguez's twin nieces Electra and Elise Avellan reprise their roles as Nurse Mona and Nurse Lisa.

Marko Zaror portrays Zaror, Mendez's enforcer, an expert in martial arts. William Sadler portrays Sheriff Doakes.

Elon Musk has a cameo as himself in the film.

Production
On June 10, 2012, Rodriguez announced that principal photography for Machete Kills had begun. Principal photography took only 29 days, as shooting wrapped on July 28, 2012.

The film was produced by Robert Rodriguez, as well as Aaron Kaufman and Iliana Nikolic, through their QuickDraw Productions, Sergei Bespalov of Aldamisa Films, Alexander Rodnyansky of AR Films, and Rick Schwartz of Overnight Productions.

Lindsay Lohan, who played April Booth in the first film, did not appear in this installment. Rodriguez said that he liked Lohan's character but she "didn't fit into the story".

The film has Charlie Sheen credited under his birth name Carlos Estévez. Expected to be a one-time move, it was Sheen's idea to use his birth name for the film, due to the film's Hispanic theme. The trailer and opening credits for the film use an "and introducing..." tag when showing Sheen's birth name.

Promotion
On October 9, 2013, Lady Gaga's Vevo released a lyric video for "Aura", a song from her third studio album Artpop, to promote the film.

Release

Theatrical
Machete Kills was released theatrically in the United States on October 11, 2013, by Open Road Pictures; the film's release date was initially set for September 13, but was pushed back to avoid competition with Insidious: Chapter 2.

Home media
Machete Kills was released on DVD and Blu-ray by Universal Pictures Home Entertainment on January 21, 2014 in the United States.

Reception
Rotten Tomatoes gave the film a rating of 29% based on 127 reviews, with a rating average of 4.6/10. The website's critical consensus reads, "While possessed with the same schlocky lunacy as its far superior predecessor, Machete Kills loses the first installment's spark in a less deftly assembled sequel." On Metacritic, which assigns a rating based on reviews from mainstream critics, the film has received a score of 41 out of 100, based on 33 critics, indictating "mixed or average reviews".

Gaga was nominated for a Golden Raspberry Award for Worst Supporting Actress for her performance, but lost to Kim Kardashian for Temptation: Confessions of a Marriage Counselor.

Possible sequel
At the end of the first film's theatrical version, two sequels are mentioned, Machete Kills and Machete Kills Again. Although, the trailer for a third film that precedes Kills is instead titled, Machete Kills Again... In Space, and is labeled as a "Coming Attraction". In 2015, Trejo told Halloween Daily News that the third film is happening. In 2022, when asked about the progress of the project, Trejo said, "Send an email to Robert Rodriguez and tell him to stop being afraid and do it!"

Notes

References

External links

 
 
 
 

2010s English-language films
2010s Spanish-language films
2010s Russian-language films
2010s American films
2010s Mexican films
2013 films
2013 action films
2013 action thriller films
American action thriller films
American films about revenge
American sequel films
American splatter films
American vigilante films
Hispanic and Latino American action films
Spanish-language American films
Film spin-offs
Grindhouse (film)
Films about Mexican drug cartels
Films about Mexican Americans
Girls with guns films
Films directed by Robert Rodriguez
Films with screenplays by Robert Rodriguez
Films produced by Robert Rodriguez
Films scored by Robert Rodriguez
Films set in Texas
Films shot in Austin, Texas
Open Road Films films
Troublemaker Studios films